Lady's Well or Our Lady's Well is a common name in the United Kingdom and Ireland for a holy well, usually dedicated to the Virgin Mary.

Examples include:
 Lady's Well, Auchmannoch
 Dundalk#Places of interest
 Effin#Wells
 Gwladys's well in Tredegar
 Hermitage, Dorset
 Holystone, Northumberland
 Honiley#History
 Ladywell Fields#History of the park
 Lancing, West Sussex#Location
 Lands of Tour and Kirkland#Lady's Well
 Mevagissey#History and toponymy
 Mulhuddart#Built heritage
 Newtowncashel#Attractions
 Our Lady's Well, Hempsted
 Roman Catholic Archdiocese of Tuam#Local pilgrimages
 Slane Castle#History
 Stow of Wedale#The church
 Wellingborough#History
 Woolpit#Our Lady of Woolpit

See also
 Lady Well
 Ladywell

Holy wells of St Mary